Franz Johannsen (4 May 1921 – 2006) was a German sprint canoer who in the 1950s. Competing in two Summer Olympics, he earned his best finish of fifth twice (1956: C-1 1000 m, C-1 10000 m).

References 

Notice of Franz Johannsen's death 

1921 births
2006 deaths
Canoeists at the 1952 Summer Olympics
Canoeists at the 1956 Summer Olympics
German male canoeists
Olympic canoeists of Germany
Olympic canoeists of the United Team of Germany